Old Pera is a small fishing village in south-eastern Jamaica, 15 minutes east of Morant Bay. The village is historic, with mountain and Caribbean sea views.

The area is known for its Kumina, a ritual celebration of a recent death based on reverence for ancestors.

References

Populated places in Jamaica